Ilma University (stylized as ILMA University) (Formerly the Institute of Business & Technology, IBT), is a private, independent university located in Karachi, Sindh, Pakistan. Formerly Institute of Business Technology, it was elevated to university status in May 2017 by legislation passed by the Provincial Sindh Assembly as a judicial Act of Sindh vide Sindh Act # XIX of 2017.

Ilma University is situated in the educational hub of Karachi city. Its purpose built main campus houses various departments, classrooms, auditorium, media, computer & hardware labs, digital library, girls common room, separate faculty offices, mosque, book shop, admission & counseling offices, cafeteria, restrooms on every floor and sports clubs.

Ilma University's Chancellor is Noman Abid Lakhani (Tamgha-e-Imtiaz).

See also
 Higher Education Commission of Pakistan
 List of universities in Pakistan

References

External links
 Ilma Official Website

Management theory
Karachi
Educational institutions established in 2001
Universities and colleges in Karachi
2001 establishments in Pakistan
Private universities and colleges in Sindh